Søren Juul Petersen (born 10 October 1963) is a Danish independent film producer who in 1997 created the production company Zeitgeist, which has produced a number of fairly successful, award-winning theatrical feature films.

Filmography 
Skyggen / Webmaster (1998)
Regel nr. 1 (2003)
Erik of het klein insectenboek (2004)
Af banen / We Are the Champions (2005)
Remix (2008)
Det grå guld (2011)

Sources 
 
Official website
Zeitgeist at DFI.dk

Danish film producers
Living people
1963 births
Place of birth missing (living people)